This is a list of notable people who are from Port Antonio, Jamaica, or have spent a large part or formative part of their career in that city.

B
 Edward Baugh, poet and scholar, recognised as an authority on the work of Derek Walcott
 Trevor Berbick, former heavyweight boxer and champion 
 Martine Beswick, actress
 Watty Burnett, reggae singer

C
 Maurice Chambers, cricketer

D
 Mikey Dread, singer, producer and broadcaster
 Archibald Dunkley, street preacher and one of the first preachers of the Rastafari movement in Jamaica
 Dillian Whyte, Professional boxer

F
 Errol Flynn, screen actor

G
 Amy Ashwood Garvey, Pan-Africanist activist and the first wife of Marcus Garvey

H
 Donna Hylton, murderer and kidnapper

J
 Merrecia James, track and field middle distance athlete

K
 King Sporty, DJ, reggae musician, and record producer

L
 Michael Lee-Chin, investor and the founder and Chairman of Portland Holdings Inc.

M
 Junior Murvin, reggae singer

O
 Dever Orgill, footballer, St Georges SC, Jamaica

R
 John Brown Russwurm, abolitionist

References 

Port Antonio
Port Antonio